Borislav Stoychev (born 26 November 1986) is a Bulgarian professional footballer who currently plays for Sportist Svoge as a defender.

Career
Borislav Stoychev has over 200 official games in First Professional Football League (Bulgaria), Super League Greece and Cypriot First Division.

Early career
Born in Haskovo, Stoychev grew up in Haskovo and played for PFC Haskovo at the age of 16. In 2005, he was chosen as an athlete of the year. In 2006, Stoychev signed a three-year contract for Levski Sofia in an undisclosed fee deal.

PFC Levski Sofia 2005-2007
He was bought by PFC Levski Sofia in January 2006. In this period Stoychev was a Bulgaria national under-21 football team player. His debut for PFC Levski Sofia was on 12 March 2006, as a substitute against Marek, replacing Lúcio Wagner in the 75th minute.

Stoychev won two First Professional Football League (Bulgaria) titles, a Bulgarian Cup and the Bulgarian Supercup for PFC Levski Sofia.

December 2006 Spanish newspaper Marca (newspaper) publishes an article about Stoychev being listed for Real Madrid CF. According to  Marca (newspaper) the 20th year old Borislav Stoychev was the best central defender in Bulgaria and he was dominating in the air game.

FC Minyor Pernik
After short period in FC Lyubimets Borislav Stoychev is bought by FC Minyor Pernik. There he has two very good years. His performance is on the highest level and Stoychev gets noticed by one of the best Bulgarian football coaches Petar Hubchev.

PFC Beroe Stara Zagora
November 2012 Stoychev signed for PFC Beroe Stara Zagora a three-year contract. He helped PFC Beroe Stara Zagora to win Bulgarian Cup and Bulgarian Supercup, scoring a goal against PFC Levski Sofia

PFC Levski Sofia 2014/2015
In 2014, after two very good years in PFC Beroe Stara Zagora, few of the leading football teams in Bulgaria are interested in Borislav Stoychev. But he chooses the proposal of PFC Levski Sofia. So he is bought by PFC Levski Sofia for second time in his career. Stoychev signes a two-year contract and during his second time in PFC Levski Sofia he plays all the championship games in the first eleven and he helps PFC Levski Sofia to reach the final for Bulgarian Cup. During this period he is called by the Bulgaria national football team for the qualification games against Malta and Italy, and two friendly games against Romania and Turkey.

Atromitos F.C.
In 2015, Atromitos F.C. attracts Borislav Stoychev to sign on a two-year contract.

Ethnikos Achna FC
In 2016, Stoychev continues his career in Cypriot First Division. There he had two very good years and he resigned the contract with them. On 23 January 2017 in a game against Doxa Katokopias FC Stoychev scored his first goal for Ethnikos Achna FC, which helped for their success. He also scored a goal for his team Ethnikos Achna FC later again against Doxa Katokopias FC.

Honours

Club
Levski Sofia
 A Group (2):  2005–06, 2006–07
 Bulgarian Cup (1): 2007
 Bulgarian Supercup (1): 2007

Beroe
 Bulgarian Cup (1): 2012–13
 Bulgarian Supercup (1): 2013

International career
He was called up to the Bulgaria squad by Ivaylo Petev  for the UEFA Euro 2016 qualifications against Italy in March 2015 and against Malta in June 2015.

Career statistics

Club

References

External links
 
 Profile at Levskisofia.info

1986 births
Living people
Bulgarian footballers
Bulgaria under-21 international footballers
Association football defenders
First Professional Football League (Bulgaria) players
Super League Greece players
PFC Levski Sofia players
PFC Vidima-Rakovski Sevlievo players
PFC Chernomorets Burgas players
Neftochimic Burgas players
OFC Sliven 2000 players
FC Lyubimets players
PFC Minyor Pernik players
PFC Beroe Stara Zagora players
Atromitos F.C. players
PFC Cherno More Varna players
Ethnikos Achna FC players
FC Arda Kardzhali players
FC Montana players
FC Sportist Svoge players
Bulgarian expatriates in Greece
Expatriate footballers in Greece
Bulgarian expatriate sportspeople in Cyprus
Expatriate footballers in Cyprus
People from Haskovo
Sportspeople from Haskovo Province